Egma was a Dutch Eurodance project, produced by Ege van Kruysdijk and Marcel Theunissen, primarily active between 1991-95. The name of the project came from first two letters of producers names "Eg" and "Ma".

History 
The project went through a couple of vocalists during the years.Starting with "Never Gonna Loose Your Love" performed by Ilse Geels and Henk Van de Wiel (former model) the project was joined by another female singer and model, named Margo Smulders (aka Keira Green). By the time of the single "Make My Day" Henk had left the project and a dancer/rapper Michael Robby joined instead (he also performed in ZOO Inc.).

Ege and Marcel also produced others projects like Usha, No Sense, Revolution Team, Wonderland, Sound Victory, Camen, The Company, BWX, Central Seven.

One video clip was shot for the single named "Love Is", also there was live performances from the television show Dance Machine 3 and 6 and French and Belgian channels.

On March 8, 2002, Henk van de Wiel was murdered in Paris as a result of robbery.

Discography

Singles

References

External links
Egma in The Eurodance Encyclopaedia.

Dutch Eurodance groups